The Médoc is a region of France, well known as a wine growing region, located in the département of Gironde, on the left bank of the Gironde estuary, north of Bordeaux. Its name comes from (Pagus) Medullicus, or "country of the Medulli", the local Celtic tribe. The region owes its economic success mainly to the production of red wine; it is home to around 1,500 vineyards.

The area also has pine forests and long sandy beaches. The Médoc's geography is not ideal for wine growing, with its proximity to the Atlantic Ocean resulting in a comparatively mild climate and high rainfall making grape rot a constant problem. It is generally believed that the nature of the region's wine derives from the soil; although the terrain is flat, excellent drainage is a necessity and the increased amount of gravel in the soil allows heat to be retained, encouraging ripening, and extensive root systems.

Viticulture

With the exception of Château Haut-Brion from Graves, all of the red wines in the 1855 Classification are from the Médoc. Many of the Médoc wines that are not in this classification were classified using the Cru Bourgeois system until 2007. Following legal challenges this category was abolished, and reintroduced in 2010 as an annual "mark of quality" depending on independent annual assessment.

See also
 Bordeaux wine regions

External links

 Médoc
  The Wine Doctor
 Visit Médoc
 About Médoc
 French-English guide book to enotourism in Médoc

Geography of Gironde
Nouvelle-Aquitaine region articles needing translation from French Wikipedia